Queen Janggyeong (10 August 1491 – 16 March 1515), of the Papyeong Yun clan, was the wife and second queen consort of Yi Yeok, King Jungjong, the 11th Joseon monarch. She was queen consort of Joseon from 1507 until her death in 1515.

Life  
Yun Myeong-hye (윤명혜) was born on 10 August 1491 during the twenty-second year reign of King Seongjong. Her father, Yun Yeo-pil, was member of the Papyeong Yun clan and her mother was member of the Suncheon Park clan (순천 박씨, 順天 朴氏). She was the fifth child within her six siblings and the fourth daughter within her five sisters, and her only older brother, Yun Im. 

Through her father, she is a third cousin of Queen Munjeong and Yun Won-hyeong, as well as a great-grandniece of Queen Jeonghui. Her father’s sister married a first cousin once removed of Queen Jeongsun; thus making her aunt be a daughter-in-law to Im Sa-hong. As well as a sister-in-law to Yi Hang, Prince Ahnyang (안양군 이항; 1480 - 1505); who was the son of King Seongjong and Royal Consort Gwi-in of the Chogye Jeong clan, and a grandaunt to Queen Inheon and a great-grandaunt to King Injo.

Because her mother died in 1498 after she gave birth to her younger sister, her maternal aunt, Grand Princess Consort Seungpyeong of the Suncheon Park clan, had raised her in her mother’s stead. Although Yun Yeo-pil did not remarry, Lady Yun did have a younger half-sister. But her family or father’s ancestry does not mention any record of a concubine or second mother besides her younger half-sister’s name and birth year.

Lady Yun's eldest sister, Princess Papyeong, married Prince Deokpung (her half-cousin), who was the son of Grand Prince Wolsan (a son of Queen Insu) and the step-son of her maternal aunt. 

In 1506 (during King Jungjong’s first year of reign), Lady Yun had entered the palace as a concubine for the King within the inner court list, granted the title suk-ui (숙의, 淑儀), junior 2nd rank concubine of the King. After Queen Dangyeong was deposed, Yun Suk-ui had been chosen from the other concubines, and became the Queen Consort of Joseon.

On 13 June 1511, the Queen gave birth to Princess Hyohye, the eldest daughter of King Jungjong, and on 10 March 1515, she later gave birth to a son, Yi Ho, the future King Injong.

Death 
The Queen died six days later in Gyeongbok Palace within the quarters of Gong Palace’s Byeol Hall at the age of 24 due to postpartum sickness. She was buried in Huireung within the city of Goyang, Gyeonggi Province and posthumously honoured with the title Queen Janggyeong.

Aftermath 
After her death, the 29-year-old King Jungjong later married the 17-year-old daughter of Yun Ji-im of the Papyeong Yun clan, posthumously honoured as Queen Munjeong, in 1517. She gave birth to Princess Uihye in 1521, Princess Hyosun in 1522, an unnamed child in 1528, Princess Gyeonghyeon in 1530, the future King Myeongjong of Joseon in 1535, and Princess Insun in 1542. 

As the Crown Prince was the Queen's political protector for a long time, he later turned into a political enemy that she should get rid of for the future of her own son. The Annals of the Joseon Dynasty tells the story of the Queen who threatened the Crown Prince to not to kill her brothers and her own son. Her hostility was not only because her ambition, but also from Yun Im's and late Kim An-ro's manipulation to get rid of the Queen. 

Many in the Sarim faction believed that Injong was poisoned by Seongryeol as the late Queen’s son, King Injong’s reign, had lasted only 9 months.but there is no evidence that this was the case. According to unofficial chronicles, there is a tale of Seongryeol finally showing love for her "adoptive" son Injong, after decades of polite indifference (in reality behind-the-scenes hatred). 

With politically indifferences and trying to received the motherly love from his stepmother, it was speculated that Queen Munjeong had slowly poisoned her stepson, King Injong, by feeding him a tteok (rice cake). Which resulted him dying on 7 August 1545 thus giving the throne to her biological son, King Myeongjong of Joseon (King Injong’s younger half-brother). 

The chronicles also tell that Queen Dowager Seongryeol was frequently visited by spirits at night after Injong's death. As she was disturbed, she moved her residence from Gyeongbok Palace to Changdeok Palace.

Queen Munjeong eventually became Queen Regent throughout the reign of her son until she died twenty years later on 5 August 1565.

Family
Parent

 Father − Yun Yeo-Pil (1466 – 1555) (윤여필, 尹汝弼)
 Uncle - Yun Yeo-hae (윤여해, 尹汝諧)
 1) Grandfather − Yun Bo (? – 1494) (윤보, 尹甫)
 2) Great-Grandfather − Yun Sa-yoon (윤사윤, 尹士昀) (1409 - 7 December 1461); Queen Jeonghui’s second older brother
 3) Great-Great-Grandfather − Yun Beon (윤번, 尹璠) (1384 - 1448); Queen Jeonghui’s father 
 4) Great-Great-Great-Grandfather − Yun Seung-rye (윤승례, 尹承禮) (? - 13 October 1397)
 5) Great-Great-Great-Great-Grandfather − Yun Cheok (윤척, 尹陟)
 5) Great-Great-Great-Great-Grandmother − Lady Lee of the Jeonui Lee clan (전의 이씨)
 4) Great-Great-Great-Grandmother − Lady Gwon of the Andong Gwon clan (안동 권씨)
 3) Great-Great-Grandmother − Grand Internal Princess Consort Heungnyeong of the Incheon Lee clan (흥녕부대부인 인천 이씨)
 2) Great-Grandmother − Princess Consort Busan of the Suwon Choi clan (부산현부인 수원 최씨, 釜山縣夫人 水原崔氏)
 1) Grandmother − Lady Yi of the Jeonju Yi clan (정부인 전주 이씨, 貞夫人 全州 李氏)
 Mother − Internal Princess Consort Suncheon of the Suncheon Park clan (순천부부인 순천 박씨, 順天府夫人 順天 朴氏) (? - 1498)
 1) Grandfather − Park Jong-seon (1435 – 1481) (박중선)
 1) Grandmother − Lady Heo of the Yangcheon Heo clan (양천 허씨)
 Aunt − Grand Internal Princess Consort Seungpyeong of the Suncheon Park clan (승평부대부인 박씨, 昇平府大夫人 朴氏) (1455 - 20 July 1506). Husband: Grand Prince Wolsan (월산대군) (5 January 1454 - 22 January 1488); Queen Insu’s son
 Half-cousin − Yi Yi, Prince Deokpung (덕풍군 이이, 德豊君 李恞) (20 August 1485 - 26 March 1506)
 Aunt − Lady Park of the Suncheon Park clan (순천 박씨, 順天 朴氏). Husband: Shin Mu-jeong (신무정, 辛武鼎)
 Aunt − Lady Park of the Suncheon Park clan (순천 박씨, 順天 朴氏). Husband: Yi Tak (이탁, 李鐸)
 Aunt − Lady Park of the Suncheon Park clan (순천 박씨, 順天 朴氏). Husband: Han Ik (한익, 韓翊) (1460 - 1488)
 Cousin − Han Se-chang (한세창, 韓世昌)
 Cousin − Han Suk-chang (한숙창, 韓叔昌) (1478 - 1537)
 Aunt − Lady Park of the Suncheon Park clan (순천 박씨, 順天 朴氏). Husband: Kim Jun (김준, 金俊)
 Uncle − Park Won-jong (박원종, 朴元宗) (1467 - 1510). Wife: Lady Yun of the Papyeong Yun clan (파평 윤씨)
 Adoptive cousin − Royal Noble Consort Gyeong of the Miryang Park clan (경빈 박씨, 敬嬪 朴氏) (1492 - 1533)
 Half-cousin − Park On (박운, 朴雲)
 Aunt − Princess Consort Seungpyeong of the Suncheon Park clan (승평부부인 순천 박씨, 昇平府夫人 順天朴氏) (? - 1485); Grand Prince Jean’s second wife. Husband: Grand Prince Jean (제안대군, 齊安大君) (13 February 1466 - 14 December 1525); Queen Ansun’s son
 Adoptive cousin − Yi Pa, Prince Nakpung (이파 낙풍군) (13 January 1515 - 15 September 1571)

Sibling

 Older sister − Princess Papyeong of the Papyeong Yun clan (파평현부인 윤씨, 坡平縣夫人 尹氏) (1485 - 16 January 1536)
 Brother-in-law - Yi Yi, Prince Deokpung (덕풍군 이이, 德豊君 李恞) (1485 - 1506)
 Nephew − Yi Ju, Prince Parim (파림군 이주, 坡林君 李珘) (1500 - 1541)
 Nephew − Yi Yu, Prince Gyerim (계림군 이유, 桂林君 李瑠) (1502 - 1545)
 Niece-in-law - Princess Consort Yeongchang of the Juksan Ahn clan (연창군부인 죽산 안씨, 延昌郡夫人 竹山 安氏)
 Niece-in-law - Princess Consort Ohcheon of the Yeonil Jeong clan (오천군부인 연일 정씨, 烏川郡夫人 延日 鄭氏)
 Grandnephew - Yi Si (연양정 이시, 延陽正 李諟)
 Niece-in-law - Lady No of the Gyoha No clan (교하 노씨, 交河 盧氏)
 Grandnephew - Yi Hyeong (이형, 李詗)
 Grandnephew - Yi Hu (이후, 李詡)
 Grandnephew - Yi Hoe, Prince Jeongyang (정양군 이회, 李誨)
 Grandnephew - Yi Ryang, Prince Eunyang (은양군 이량, 李諒)
 Grandniece - Lady Yi of the Jeonju Yi clan (전주 이씨, 全州 李氏)
 Grandniece - Lady Yi of the Jeonju Yi clan (전주 이씨, 全州 李氏)
 Nephew − Yi Ri (전성부정 이리, 全城副正 李璃)
 Older sister − Princess Consort Papyeong of the Papyeong Yun clan (파평군부인 윤씨, 坡平郡夫人 尹氏)
 Brother-in-law - Yi Jeong, Prince Palgye (팔계군 이정, 八溪君 李淨)
 Older brother − Yun Im (윤임, 尹任) (1487 - 30 August 1545)
 Sister-in-law - Lady Yi of the Yeoheung Yi clan (정부인 증 정경부인 여흥 이씨) (? - 1528)
 Niece - Lady Yun (윤씨)
 Niece - Lady Yun (윤씨)
 Nephew - Yun Heung-in (윤흥인, 尹興仁) (1516 - September 1545)
 Niece-in-law - Lady Ahn of the Sunheung Ahn clan (순흥 안씨)
 Grandnephew - Yun Gyeong (윤경)
 Grandnephew - Yun Ho (윤호, 尹琥)
 Grandniece-in-law - Hong Ok-hwan (홍옥환, 洪玉環), Lady Hong (1531 - ?)
 Grandnephew - Yun Bal (윤발, 尹 玉+發)
 Grandniece - Lady Yun (윤씨)
 Grandnephew-in-law - Sim Gwang-bo (심광보)
 Grandniece - Lady Yun (윤씨)
 Grandnephew—in-law - Im Eung-woo (임응우)
 Nephew - Yun Heung-ui (윤흥의, 尹興義)
 Niece-in-law - Lady Han (한씨)
 Grandniece - Lady Yun (윤씨)
 Grandnephew-in-law - Lee Geon-yong (이견용)
 Grandniece - Lady Yun (윤씨)
 Grandnephew-in-law - Gu Sa-min (구사민)
 Nephew - Yun Heung-rye (윤흥례, 尹興禮)
 Niece-in-law - Lady Yang (양씨)
 Grandniece - Lady Yun (윤씨)
 Grandnephew-in-law - Lee Deok-eung (이덕응)
 Grandniece - Lady Yun (윤씨)
 Grandnephew-in-law - Lee Hong-yun (이홍윤)
 Adoptive grandnephew - Yun Bal (윤발, 尹 玉+發); son of Yun Heung-in
 Sister-in-law - Lady Gwak of the Hyeonpung Gwak clan (정부인 증 정경부인 현풍 곽씨) (1517 - 1589)
 Nephew - Yun Heung-ji (윤흥지, 尹興智)
 Niece-in-law - Lady Park (박씨)
 Grandnephew - Yun Chim (윤침)
 Nephew - Yun Heung-shin (윤흥신, 尹興信) (? - 1592)
 Niece-in-law - Lady Shin (신씨)
 Grandnephew - Yun Seong (윤성, 尹珹)
 Grandnephew - Yun Seo (윤서)
 Nephew - Yun Heung-chung (윤흥충, 尹興忠)
 Niece-in-law - Lady Lee (이씨)
 Older sister − Yun Cheon-deok (윤천덕, 尹千德), Lady Yun of the Papyeong Yun clan (1488 - ?)
 Brother-in-law - Kim Hun (김혼, 金渾) of the Gangneung Kim clan
 Younger sister − Lady Yun (윤씨, 尹氏) (1498 - ?)
 Brother-in-law - Yi Eok-son (이억손, 李億孫) of the Jeonju Yi clan; Yi Yeong, Prince Cheongan’s son (청안군 이영, 淸安君 李嶸)
 Younger half-sister − Yun Ok-chun (윤옥춘, 尹玉春) (1518 - ?)

Consort

 Husband − Yi Yeok, King Jungjong (16 April 1488 – 29 November 1544) (조선 중종)
 Father-in-law − Yi Hyeol, King Seongjong (성종대왕, 成宗大王) (1457 - 1494)
 Mother-in-law − Yun Chang-nyeon, Queen Jeonghyeon of the Papyeong Yun clan (정현왕후 윤씨, 貞顯王后 尹氏) (1462 - 1530)

Issue

 Daughter − Yi Ok-ha, Princess Hyohye (13 June 1511 – 6 May 1531) (효혜공주). Husband: Kim Hui (? – 1531) (김희); son of Kim Ahn-ro (김안로, 金安老)
 Granddaughter − Kim Seon-ok (김선옥, 金善玉) of the Yeonan Kim clan (연안 김씨, 延安 金氏) (1531 - ?). Husband: Yun Baek-won (윤백원, 尹百源) (1528 - 1589); Queen Munjeong’s nephew
 Son − Yi Ho, King Injong (10 March 1515 – 7 August 1545) (조선 인종). Wife: Queen Inseong of the Bannam Park clan (7 October 1514 – 6 January 1578) (인성왕후 박씨)

In popular culture
 Portrayed by Go Bo-gyeol in the 2017 KBS2 TV series Queen for Seven Days.

See also 
 Queen Jeonghui - Queen Janggyeong’s ascendant through her father
Queen Jeonghyeon - Queen Janggyeong’s ascendant 
 Queen Munjeong - Queen Janggyeong’s relative 
Yun Wonhyeong - Queen Janggyeong’s relative 
Yun Im - Queen Janggyeong’s older brother 
Royal Consort Hee-bi of the Papyeong Yun clan - a consort of King Chunghye of Goryeo and Janggyeong’s ascendant

References

Notes

1491 births
1515 deaths
Royal consorts of the Joseon dynasty
Korean queens consort
Deaths in childbirth
16th-century Korean women
Papyeong Yun clan